Euthyatira semicircularis is a moth in the  family Drepanidae. It is found in North America, where it has been recorded from British Columbia to California, east to Utah. The habitat consists of coastal rainforests and boreal forests.

The wingspan is 39–45 mm. The forewings of the males are silvery grey, but dark grey in females. There are three or four arc-shaped black lines across the wing in the basal area and there is a semicircular whitish or pale yellow patch at the base, bordered by black. There is also a pale grey apical patch, bordered by a black oblique apical dash. The postmedian line is dark and double, while the subterminal line is faint and terminates at the apical dash. The hindwings are light yellowish-grey with dark veins. Adults are on wing from May to July.

References

Moths described in 1881
Thyatirinae